Kyriakos Tamvakis (born in 1950) is a Greek theoretical physicist and professor at the University of Ioannina. Kyriakos Tamvakis studied at the University of Athens and gained his Ph.D. at Brown University, Providence, Rhode Island, USA in 1978. His thesis title was "Induced Boson Selfcouplings In Four Fermion And Yukawa Theories". Since then he has held several positions at CERN’s Theory Division in Geneva, Switzerland. He has been Professor of Theoretical Physics at the University of Ioannina, Greece, since 1982. Professor Tamvakis has published more than 100 articles on theoretical high-energy physics in various journals and has written two textbooks in Greek, on quantum mechanics and on classical electrodynamics.

References

External links
 Publications in Inspire
 Ph.D.Thesis (Brown University, 1978)

21st-century Greek physicists
Living people
1950 births
Theoretical physicists
People associated with CERN
National and Kapodistrian University of Athens alumni
Brown University alumni
20th-century Greek physicists